Tohatin is a commune located 8 kilometers east of Chişinău, Moldova on the road leading to Vadul lui Vodă. The commune is composed of three villages: Buneți, Cheltuitori and Tohatin.

Tohatin is similar to other small Moldovan villages, with less than 200 dwellings.  Because of its proximity to Chișinău, it has become a bedroom community.

References

Communes of Chișinău Municipality